Deleya halophila (also known as Halomonas halophila) is a salt-loving, gram-negative bacteria. It is known to habitat marine environments, solar salterns, saline soils, and salted food. The genus was named after J. De Ley, a noted biologist. Its type strain is CCM 3662.

This particular species is anaerobic, rod-shaped and motile, thanks to possessing eight petritichous flagella. It grows optimally in 7.5% (wt/vol) sodium chloride solution. Albeit, salt shock is achieved with a concentration of 2-2.5M, affecting cell division and protein synthesis.  Its reaction to heat shock is also associated with the medium's salt concentration.

This species is also a good exponent of biomineralisation, particularly precipitation of calcium carbonate.

References

Further reading
Growth characteristics: 
Physiological features at different salt concentrations:

External links
Original description journal article
StrainInfo entry

Oceanospirillales
Bacteria described in 1984